In the video game industry, the market for home video game consoles has frequently been segmented into generations, grouping consoles that are considered to have shared in a competitive marketspace. Since the first home consoles in 1972, there have been nine defined home console generations.

A new console generation typically has occurred approximately every five years, in keeping pace with Moore's law for technology, though more recent generations have had extended periods due to the use of console revisions rather than completely new designs. Not all home consoles are defined as part of these generations; only those considered to be significant competitive consoles are classed into generations, and systems such as microconsoles are often omitted from these generations.

Background and origins
Like most consumer electronics, home video game consoles are developed based on improving the features offered by an earlier product with advances made by newer technology. For video game consoles, these improvements typically occur every five years, following a Moore's law progression where a rough aggregate measure of processing power doubles every 18 months or increases ten-fold after five years. This cyclic market has resulted in an industry-wide adoption of the razorblade model in selling consoles at minimal profit margin while making revenue from the sale of games produced for that console, and then transitioning users to the next console model at the fifth year as the successor console enters the market. This approach incorporates planned obsolescence into the products to continue to bring consumers towards purchasing the newer models.

Because of the industry dynamics, many console manufacturers release their new consoles in roughly the same time period, with their consoles typically offering similar processing power and capabilities as their competitors. This systematic market has created the nature of console generations, categorizing the primary consoles into these segmented time periods that represent consoles with similar capabilities and which shared the same competitive space. Like consoles, these generations typically start five years after its prior one, though may have long tails as popular consoles remain viable well beyond five years.

The use of the generation label came after the start of the 21st century as console technology started to mature, with the terminology applied retroactively to earlier consoles. However, no exact definition and delineation of console generations was consistently developed in the industry or academic literature since that point. Some schemes have been based on direct market data (including a seminal work published in an IEEE journal in 2002), while others are based on technology shifts. Wikipedia itself has been noted for creating its own version of console generation definitions that differ from other academic sources, the definitions from Wikipedia has been adopted by other sources but without having any true rationale behind it. The discrepancies between how consoles are grouped into generations and how these generations are named have caused confusion when trying to compare shifts in the video game marketplace compared to other consumer markets. Kemerer et al. (2017) provide a comparative analysis of these different generations through systems released up to 2010 as shown below.

Console generation timeline
For purposes of organization, the generations described here and subsequent pages maintain the Wikipedia breakdown of generation, generally breaking consoles apart by technology features whenever possible and with other consoles released in that same period incorporated within that same generation, and starting with the Odyssey and Pong-style home consoles as the first generation, an approach that has generally been adopted and extended by video game journalism. In this approach the generation "starts" with the release of the first console considered to have those features, and considered to end with the known last discontinuation of a console in that generation. For example, the third generation is considered to end in 2003 with the formal discontinuation of the Nintendo Entertainment System that year. This can create years with overlaps between multiple generations, as shown.

This approach uses the concepts of "bits", or the size of individual word length handled by the processors on the console, for the earlier console generations. Longer word lengths generally led to improved gameplay concepts, graphics, and audio capabilities than shorter ones. The use of bits to market consoles to consumers started with the TurboGrafx 16, a console that used an 8-bit central processing unit similar to the Nintendo Entertainment System (NES), but included a 16-bit graphical processing unit. NEC, the console's manufacturer, took to market the console as a "16-bit" system over the NES' "8-bit" to establish it as a superior system. Other advertisers followed suit, creating a period known as the "bit wars" that lasted through the fifth generation, where console manufactures tried to outsell each other simply on the bit-count of their system. Aside from some "128 Bit" advertising slogans at the beginning of the sixth generation, marketing with bits largely stopped after the fifth generation. Though the bit terminology was no longer used in newer generations, the use of bit-count helped to establish the idea of console generations, and the earlier generations gained alternate names based on the dominant bit-count of the major systems of that era, such as the third generation being the 8-bit era or generation.

Later console generations are based on groupings of release dates rather than common hardware as base hardware configurations between consoles have greatly diverged, generally following trends in generation definition given by video game and mainstream journalism. Handheld consoles and other gaming systems and innovations are frequently grouped within the release years associated with the home console generations; for example the growth of digital distribution is associated with the seventh generation.

Console generation overview
The following table provides an overview of the major hardware technical specifications of the consoles of each major generations by central processor unit (CPU), graphics processor unit (GPU), memory, game media, and other features.

History
The development of video game consoles primarily follows the history of video gaming in the North American and Japanese markets. Few other markets saw any significant console development on their own, such as in Europe where personal computers tended to be favored alongside imports of video game consoles. The clones of video game consoles in less-developed markets like China and Russia are not considered here.

First generation (1972–1980) 

The first generation of home consoles were generally limited to dedicated consoles with just one or two games pre-built into the console hardware, with a limited means to alter gameplay factors. In the case of the Odyssey, while it did ship with "game cards", these did not have any programmed games on them but instead acted as jumpers to alter the existing circuitry pathway, and did not extend the capabilities of the console. Unlike most other future console generations, the first generation of consoles were typically built in limited runs rather than as an ongoing product line.

The first home console was the Magnavox Odyssey in September 1972 based on Baer's "Brown Box" design. Originally built from solid-state circuits, Magnavox transitioned to integrated circuit chips that were inexpensive, and developed a new line of consoles in the Odyssey series from 1975 to 1977. At the same, Atari had successfully launched Pong as an arcade game in 1972, and began work to make a home console version in late 1974, which they eventually partnered with Sears to the new home Pong console by the 1975 Christmas season. Pong offered several technological advantages over the Odyssey, including an internal sound chip and the ability to track score. Baer, who was struggling with Magnavox' management on how to market the console, gave his colleague Arnold Greenberg of Coleco a heads-up of a new low-cost chip ideal for home consoles, which led Coleco to develop the first Telstar console in 1976. With Magnavox, Atari and Coleco all vying in the console space by 1976 and further cost reductions in key processing chips from General Instruments, numerous third-party manufacturers entered the console market by 1977, most simply cloning Pong or other games and of poor quality. This led to market saturation by 1977, with several hundreds of consoles on the market, and the industry's first market crash. Atari and Coleco attempted to make dedicated consoles with wholly new games to remain competitive, including Atari's Video Pinball series and Coleco's Telstar Arcade, but by this point, the first steps of the market's transition to the second generation of consoles had begun, making these units obsolete near release.

The Japanese market for gaming consoles followed a similar path at this point. Nintendo had already been a business partner with Magnavox by 1971 and helped to design the early light guns for the console. Dedicated home game consoles in Japan appeared in 1975 with Epoch Co.'s TV Tennis Electrotennis, which it had made in partnership with Magnavox as well. As in the United States, numerous clones of these dedicated consoles began to appear, most made by the large television manufacturers like Toshiba and Sharp, and these games would be called TV geemu or terebi geemu (TV game) as the designation for "video games" in Japan. Nintendo became a major player when Mitsubishi, having lost their manufacturer Systek due to bankruptcy, turned to the company to help continue to build their Color TV-Game line, which went on to sell about 1.5 million units across five different units between 1977 and 1980.

Second generation (1976–1992) 

The second generation of home consoles was distinguished by the introduction of the game cartridge, where the game's code is stored in read-only memory (ROM) within the cartridge. When the cartridge is slotted into the console, the electrical connections allow the main console's processors to read the game's code from the ROM. While ROM cartridges had been used in other computer applications prior, the ROM game cartridge was first implemented in the Fairchild Video Entertainment System (VES) in November 1976. Additional consoles during this generation, all which used cartridge-based systems, included the Atari 2600 (known as the Atari Video Computer System (VCS) at launch), the Magnavox Odyssey 2, Mattel Electronics' Intellivision, and the ColecoVision. In addition to consoles, newer processor technology allowed games to support up to 8 colors and up to 3-channel audio effects.

With the introduction of cartridge-based consoles came the need to develop a wide array of games for them. Atari was one of the forefronts in development for its Atari 2600. Atari marketed the console across multiple regions including into Japan, and retained control of all development aspects of the games. Game developments coincided with the Golden age of arcade video games that started in 1978–1979 with the releases of Space Invaders and Asteroids, and home versions of these arcade games were ideal targets. The Atari 2600 version of Space Invaders, released in 1980, was considered the killer app for home video game consoles, helping to quadruple the console's sales that year. Similarly, Coleco had beaten Atari to a key licensing deal with Nintendo to bring Donkey Kong as a pack-in game for the Colecovision, helping to drive its sales.

At the same time, Atari has been acquired by Warner Communications, and internal policies led to the departure of four key programmers David Crane, Larry Kaplan, Alan Miller, and Bob Whitehead, who went and formed Activision. Activision proceeded to develop their own Atari 2600 games as well as games for other systems. Atari attempted legal action to stop this practice but ended up settling out of court, with Activision agreeing to pay royalties but otherwise able to continue game development, making Activision the first third-party game developer. Numerous other companies saw Activision's success and jumped into game development to try to make fast money on the rapidly expanding North America video game market. This led to a loss of publishing control and dilution of the game market by the early 1980s. Additionally, in following on the success of Space Invaders, Atari and other companies had remained eager for licensed video game possibilities. Atari had banked heavily on commercial sales of E.T. the Extra-Terrestrial in 1982, but it was rushed to market and poorly-received, and failed to make Atari's sales estimates. Along with competition from inexpensive home computers, the North American home console market crashed in 1983.

For the most part, the 1983 crash signaled the end of this generation as Nintendo's introduction of the Famicom the same year brought the start of the third generation. When Nintendo brought the Famicom to North America under the name "Nintendo Entertainment System", it helped to revitalize the industry, and Atari, now owned by Jack Tramiel, pushed on sales of the previously-successful Atari 2600 under new branding to keep the company afloat for many more years while he transitioned the company more towards the personal computer market. The Atari 2600 stayed in production until 1992, marking the end of the second generation.

Third generation (1983–2003) 

Frequently called the "8-bit generation", the third generation's consoles used 8-bit processors, which allowed up to five bits of color (25 or 32 colors), five audio channels, and more advanced graphics capability including sprites and tiles rather than block-based graphics of the second generation. Further, the third console saw the market dominance shift from the United States to Japan as a result of the 1983 crash.

Both the Sega SG-1000 and the Nintendo Famicom launched near simultaneously in Japan in 1983. The Famicom, after some initial technical recalls, soon gained traction and became the best selling console in Japan by the end of 1984. By that point Nintendo wanted to bring the console to North America but recognized the faults that the video game crash had caused. It took several steps to redesign the console to make it look less like a game console and rebranded it as the "Nintendo Entertainment System" (NES) for North America to avoid the "video game" label stigma. The company also wanted to avoid the loss of publishing control that had occurred both in North America as well as in Asia after the Famicom's release, and created a lockout system that required all game cartridges to be manufactured by Nintendo to include a special chip. If this chip was not present, the console would fail to play the game. This further gave Nintendo direct control on the titles published for the system, rejecting those it felt were too mature. The NES launched in North America in 1985, and helped to revitalize the video game market there.

Sega attempted to compete with the NES with its own Master System, released later in 1985 in both the US and Japan, but did not gain traction to compete. Similarly, Atari's attempts to compete with the NES via the Atari 7800 in 1987 failed to knock the NES from its dominant position. The NES remained in production until 2003, when it was discontinued along with its successor, the Super Nintendo Entertainment System.

Fourth generation (1987–2004) 

The fourth generation of consoles, also known as the "16-bit generation", further advanced core console technology with 16-bit processors, improving the available graphics and audio capabilities of games.

NEC's TurboGrafx-16 (or PC Engine as released in Japan), first released in 1987, is considered the first fourth generation console even though it still had an 8-bit CPU. The console's 16-bit graphics processor gave it capabilities comparable to the other fourth generation systems, and NEC's marketing had pushed the console being an advancement over the NES as a "16-bit" system. Both Sega and Nintendo entered the fourth generation with true 16-bit systems in the 1988 Sega Genesis (MegaDrive in Japan) and the 1990 Super Nintendo Entertainment System (SNES, Super Famicom in Japan). SNK also entered the competition with a modified version of their Neo Geo MVS arcade system into the Neo Geo, released in 1990, which attempted to bridge the gap between arcade and home console systems with the shared use of common game cartridges and memory cards. This generation was notable for the so-called "console wars" between Nintendo and Sega primarily in North America. Sega, to try to challenge Nintendo's dominant position, created the mascot character Sonic the Hedgehog, who exhibited cool personality to appeal to the Western youth in contrast to Nintendo's Mario, and bundled the Genesis with the game of the same name. The strategy succeeded with Sega becoming the dominant player in North America until the mid-1990s.

During this generation, the technology costs of using optical discs in the form of CD-ROMs has dropped sufficiently to make them desirable to be used for shipping computer software, including for video games for personal computers. CD-ROMs offered more storage space than game cartridges and could allow for full-motion video and other detailed audio-video works to be used in games. Console manufacturers adapted by creating hardware add-ons to their consoles that could read and play CD-ROMs, including NEC's TurboGrafx-CD add-on (as well as the integrated TurboDuo system) in 1988, and the Sega CD add-on for the Genesis in 1991, and the Neo Geo CD in 1994. Costs of these add-ons were generally high, nearing the same price as the console itself, and with the introduction of disc-based consoles in the fifth generation starting in 1993, these fell by the wayside. Nintendo had initially worked with Sony to develop a similar add-on for the SNES, the Super NES CD-ROM, but just before its introduction, business relationships between Nintendo and Sony broke down, and Sony would take its idea on to develop the fifth generation PlayStation. Additionally, Philips attempted to enter the market with a dedicated CD-ROM format, the CD-i, also released in 1990, that included other uses for the CD-ROM media beyond video games but the console never gained traction.

The fourth generation had a long tail that overlapped with the fifth generation, with the SNES's discontinuation in 2003 marking the end of the generation. To keep their console competitive with the new fifth generation ones, Nintendo took to the use of coprocessors manufactured into the game cartridges to enhance the capabilities of the SNES. This included the Super FX chip, which was first used in the game Star Fox in 1993, generally considered one of the first games to use real-time polygon-based 3D rendering on consoles.

Fifth generation (1993–2006) 

During this time home computers gained greater prominence as a way of playing video games. The video game console industry nonetheless continued to thrive alongside home computers, due to the advantages of much lower prices, easier portability, circuitry specifically dedicated towards video games, the ability to be played on a television set (which PCs of the time could not do in most cases), and intensive first party software support from manufacturers who were essentially banking their entire future on their consoles.

Besides the shift to 32-bit processors, the fifth generation of consoles also saw most companies excluding Nintendo shift to dedicated optical media formats instead of game cartridges, given their lower cost of production and higher storage capacity. Initial consoles of the fifth generation attempted to capitalize on the potential power of CD-ROMs, which included the Amiga CD32, 3DO and the Atari Jaguar in 1993. However, early in the cycle, these systems were far more expensive than existing fourth-generation models and has much smaller game libraries. Further, Nintendo's use of co-processors in late SNES games further kept the SNES as one of the best selling systems over new fifth generation ones.

Two of the key consoles of the fifth generation were introduced in 1995: the Sega Saturn, and the Sony PlayStation, both which challenged the SNES' ongoing dominance. While the Saturn sold well, it did have a number of technical flaws, but established Sega for a number of key game series going forward. The PlayStation, in addition to using optical media, also introduced the use of memory cards as to save the state of a game. Though memories cards had been used by Neo Geo to allow players to transfer game information between home and arcade systems, the PlayStation's approach allowed games to have much longer gameplay and narrative elements, leading to highly-successful role-playing games like Final Fantasy VII. By 1996, the PlayStation became the best-selling console over the SNES.

Nintendo released their next console, the Nintendo 64 in late 1996. Unlike other fifth generation units, it still used game cartridges, as Nintendo believed the load-time advantages of cartridges over CD-ROMs was still essential, as well as their ability to continue to use lockout mechanisms to protect copyrights. The system also included support for memory cards as well, and Nintendo developed a strong library of first-party titles for the game, including Super Mario 64 and The Legend of Zelda: Ocarina of Time that helped to drive its sales. While the Nintendo 64 did not match the PlayStation's sales, it kept Nintendo a key competitor in the home console market alongside Sony and Sega.

As with the transition from the fourth to fifth generation, the fifth generation has a long overlap with the sixth console generation, with the PlayStation remaining in production until 2005.

Sixth generation (1998–2013)

By the sixth generation, console technology began to catch up to performance of personal computers of the time, and the use of bits as their selling point fell by the wayside. The console manufactures focused on the individual strengths of their game libraries as marketing instead. The consoles of the sixth generation saw further adoption of optical media, expanding into the DVD format for even greater data storage capacity, additional internal storage solutions to function as memory cards, as well as adding support either directly or through add-ons to connect to the Internet for online gameplay. Consoles began to move towards a convergence of features of other electronic living room devices and moving away from single-feature systems.

By this point, there were only three major players in the market: Sega, Sony, and Nintendo. Sega got an early lead with the Dreamcast first released in Japan in 1998. It was the first home console to include a modem to allow players to connect to the Sega network and play online games. However, Sega found several technical issues that had to be resolved before its Western launch in 1999. Though its Western release was more successful than in Japan, the console was soon outperformed by Sony's PlayStation 2 released in 2000. The PlayStation 2 was the first console to add support for DVD playback in addition to CD-ROM, as well as maintaining backward compatibility with games from the PlayStation library, which helped to draw consumers that remained on the long-tail of the PlayStation. While other consoles of the sixth generation had not anticipated this step, the PlayStation 2's introduction of backwards compatibility became a major design consideration of future generations. Unable to compete with Sony, Sega discontinued the Dreamcast in 2001 and left the hardware market, instead focusing on its software properties. Nintendo's entry in the sixth generation was the GameCube in 2001, its first system to use optical discs based on the miniDVD format. A special Game Boy Player attachment allowed the GameCube to use any of the GameBoy cartridges as well, and adapters were available to allow the console to connect to the Internet via broadband or modem.

At this point Microsoft also entered the console market with its first Xbox system, released in 2001. Microsoft considered the PlayStation 2's success as a threat to the personal computer in the living room space, and had developed the Xbox to compete. As such, the Xbox was designed based more on Microsoft's experience from personal computers, using an operating system built out from its Microsoft Windows and DirectX features, utilizing a hard disk for save game store, built-in Ethernet functionality, and created the first console online service, Xbox Live to support multiplayer games.

Seventh generation (2005–2017) 

Video game consoles had become an important part of the global IT infrastructure by the mid-2000s. It was estimated that video game consoles represented 25% of the world's general-purpose computational power in the year 2007.

By the seventh generation, Sony, Microsoft, and Nintendo had all developed consoles designed to interface with the Internet, adding networking support for either wired and wireless connections, online services to support multiplayer games, digital storefronts for digital purchases of games, and both internal storage and support for external storage on the console for these games. These consoles also added support for digital television resolutions through HDMI interfaces, but as the generation occurred in the midst of the High-definition optical disc format war between Blu-ray and HD-DVD, a standard for high-definition playback was yet to be fixed. A further innovation came by the use of motion controllers, either built into the console or offered as an add-on afterwards.

Microsoft entered the seventh generation first with the Xbox 360 in 2005. The Xbox 360 saw several hardware revisions over its lifetime which became a standard practice for Microsoft going forward; these revisions offered different features such as a larger internal hard drive or a fast processor at a higher price point. As shipped, the Xbox 360 supported DVD discs and Microsoft had opted to support the HD-DVD format with an add-on for playback of HD-DVD films. However, this format ended up as deprecated compared to Blu-ray. The Xbox 360 was backward compatible with about half of the original Xbox library. Through its lifetime, the Xbox 360 was troubled by a consistent hardware fault known as "the Red Ring of Death" (RROD), and Microsoft spent over $1 billion correcting the problem.

Sony's PlayStation 3 was released in 2006. The PlayStation 3 represented a shift of the internal hardware from Sony's Emotion Engine to a novel processor named CELL that would require use of new parallel processing programming paradigms to use efficiently. The CELL had a notoriety of being hard to develop for, which would cause issues with many multi-platform game released for the PS3. Initial PlayStation 3 shipped with a special Emotion Engine daughterboard that allowed for backwards compatibility of PlayStation 2 games, but later revisions of the unit removed this, leaving software-based emulation for PlayStation games available. Sony banked on the Blu-ray format, which was included from the start. With the PlayStation 3, Sony introduced the PlayStation Network for its online services and storefront.

Nintendo introduced the Wii in 2006 around the same time as the PlayStation 3. Nintendo lacked the same manufacturing capabilities and relationships with major hardware supplies as Sony and Microsoft, and to compete, diverged on a feature-for-feature approach and instead developed the Wii around the novel use of motion controls in the Wii Remote. This "blue ocean strategy", releasing a product where there was no competition, was considered part of the unit's success, and which drove Microsoft and Sony to develop their own motion control accessors to compete. Nintendo provided various online services that the Wii could connect too, including the Virtual Console where players could purchase emulated games from Nintendo's past consoles as well as games for the Wii. The Wii used regular sized DVDs for its game medium but also directly supported GameCube discs. The Wii was generally considered a surprising success that many developers had initially overlooked. Based on the success of the Wii Remote controller, both Microsoft and Sony released similar motion detection controllers for their consoles. Microsoft introduced the Kinect motion controller device for the Xbox 360, which served as both a camera, microphone, and motion sensor for numerous games. Sony released the PlayStation Move, a system consisting of a camera and lit handheld controllers, which worked with its PlayStation 3.

The seventh generation concluded with the discontinuation of the PlayStation 3 in 2017.

Eighth generation (2012–Present) 

Aside from the usual hardware enhancements, consoles of the eighth generation focus on further integration with other media and increased connectivity. Hardware improvements pushed for higher frame rates at up to 4k resolutions.

The Wii U, introduced in 2012, was considered by Nintendo to be a successor to the Wii but geared to more serious players. The console supported backward compatibility with the Wii, including its motion controls, and introduced the Wii U GamePad, a tablet/controller hybrid that acted as a second screen. Nintendo further refined its network offerings to develop the Nintendo Network service to combine storefront and online connectivity services. The Wii U did not sell as well as Nintendo had planned, as they found people mistook the GamePad to be a tablet they could take with them away from the console, and the console struggled to draw the third-party developers as the Wii had.

Both the PlayStation 4 and Xbox One came out in 2013. Both were similar improvements over the previous generation's respective consoles, providing more computational power to support up to 60 frames per seconds at 1080p resolutions for some games. Each unit also saw a similar set of revisions and repackaging to develop high- and low-end cost versions. In the case of the Xbox One, the console's initially launch had included the Kinect device but this became highly controversial in terms of potential privacy violations and lack of developer support, and by its mid-generation refresh, the Kinect had been dropped and discontinued as a game device.

Later in the eighth generation, Nintendo released the Nintendo Switch in 2017. The Switch is considered the first hybrid game console. It uses a special CPU/GPU combination that can run at different clock frequencies depending on how it is used. It can be placed into a special docking unit that is hooked to a television and a permanent power supply, allowing faster clock frequencies to be used to be played at higher resolutions and frame rates, and thus more comparable to a home console. Alternatively, it can be removed and used either with the attached Joy-Con controllers as a handheld unit, or can be even played as a tablet-like system via its touchscreen. In these modes, the CPU/GPU run at lower clock speeds to conserve battery power, and the graphics are not as robust as in the docked version. A larger suite of online services was added through the Nintendo Switch Online subscription, including several free NES and SNES titles, replacing the past Virtual Console system. The Switch was designed to address many of the hardware and marketing faults around the Wii U's launch, and has become one of the company's fastest-selling consoles after the Wii.

Ninth generation (2020–present)

Both Microsoft and Sony released successors to their home consoles in November 2020. Both console families target 4k and 8K resolution televisions at high frame rates, support for real-time ray tracing rendering, and the use of high-performance solid-state drives (SSD) as internal high-speed memory to make delivering game content much faster than from reading from optical disc or standard hard drives, which can eliminate loading times and make open world games appear seamless.

Microsoft released the fourth generation of Xbox with the Xbox Series X and Series S on November 10, 2020. The Series X has a base performance target of 60 frames per second at 4K resolution to be four times as powerful as the Xbox One X. One of Microsoft's goals with both units was to assure backward compatibility with all games supported by the Xbox One, including those original Xbox and Xbox 360 titles that are backward compatible with the Xbox One, allowing the Xbox Series X and Series S to support four generations of games.

Sony's PlayStation 5 was released on November 12, 2020, and also is a similar performance boost over the PlayStation 4. The PlayStation 5 uses a custom SSD solution with much higher input/output rates comparable to RAM chip speeds, significantly improving rendering and data streaming speeds. The chip architecture is comparable to the PlayStation 4, allowing backwards compatible with most of the PlayStation 4 library while select games will need chip timing tweaking to make them compatible.

Sales comparison

Below is a timeline of each generation with the top three home video consoles of each generation based on worldwide sales. For a complete list of home video consoles released in each generation please see the respective article of each generation.

Notes

References

Home video game consoles
Home video game consoles